Wilhelmina (also: Wilhelmena, Wilhelmine, Wilhemina) is a feminine given name, the Dutch, German and Yiddish form of Wilhelm or William, which is derived from the Germanic wil, meaning "will, desire" and helm, meaning "helmet, protection". Wilhelmina was ranked in the top 1000 most popular names for girls in the United States between 1900 and 1940 but is rarely used today. In many European countries, this name is once again very popular. Nicknames for Wilhelmina include, but are not restricted to, Minna, Mina, Mineke, Minnie, Willie and Billie.

Notable persons with this name

 Augusta Wilhelmena Fredericka Appel (1905–1973), American silent and early sound film actress
 Joyce Penelope Wilhelmina Frankenberg (born 1951), British-American actress
 Katherine Elizabeth Wilhelmina Sharon Beuving Langbroek (born 1965), Australian comedian, radio and television presenter 
 Wilhelmine Schröder-Devrient (1804–1860), German operatic soprano
Wilhelmina van den Berg (born 1947), Dutch sprinter
 Wilhelmina von Bremen (1909–1976), German American gold medalist in the Olympics
 Vilhelmina Bardauskienė (born 1958), Lithuanian long jumper 
 Wilhelmina Cooper (1939–1980), Dutch-American high fashion model and founder of Wilhelmina Models
 Wilhelmina Drucker (1847–1925), Dutch politician and writer
 Wilhelmina Feemster Jashemski (1910–2007), American classical archaeologist
 Vilhelmina Gyldenstolpe (1779–1858), Swedish court official
 Wilhelmina Hay Abbott (1884-1957), Scottish suffragist and feminist
 Wilhelmine Kekelaokalaninui Widemann Dowsett (1861–1929), Native Hawaiian suffragist
 Wilhelmina Skogh (1849–1926), hotel and restaurant owner from Sweden
 Wilhelmina Houdini (1876–1943), American stage assistant and wife of Harry Houdini
 Wilhelmena Rhodes Kelly (1946–2019), African-American genealogist 
 Wilhelmina Koskull (1778–1852), Swedish courtier
 Vilhelmína Lever (1802–1879), Icelandic shopkeeper and restaurateur
 Wilhelmina Rietveld (1949–1973), Dutch-Canadian model
 Wilhelmina Angela Schmidt (1897–1998), Dutch author, playwright and cabaret singer
 Wilhelmine Williams (1878–1944), American feminist, pacifist, professor, and Latin American historian

Artists and art patrons 
 Wilhelmina Barns-Graham (1912–2004), British abstract artist
 Wilhelmina Pruit (1865-1947), American poet
 Wilhelmine Schröder (1839–1924), Swedish writer
 Wilhelmina Gravallius (1809–1884), Swedish writer
 Wilhelmina Holladay (born 1922), American art collector and patron
 Wilhelmine Holmboe-Schenström (1842–1938), Norwegian opera singer
 Wilhelmina Krafft (1778–1828), Swedish painter and miniaturist
 Amalia Wilhelmina Königsmarck (1663–1740), Swedish painter and poet
 Wilhelmina Seegmiller (1866–1913), Canadian-born American author, illustrator, art teacher
 Wilhelmena Fuller Webb (1915–2012), American writer

Royalty and nobility 
 Wilhelmina of the Netherlands (1880–1962), Queen of the Netherlands from 1890 until her abdication in 1948
 Princess Wilhelmine of Denmark (disambiguation), several Danish princesses
 Wilhelmina Amalia of Brunswick (1673–1742), empress consort of the Holy Roman Empire of the German Nation, Queen of the Germans 
 Wilhelmine of Bayreuth (1709–1758), German princess (the older sister of Frederick the Great) and composer
 Wilhelmine of Prussia, Margravine of Brandenburg-Bayreuth (1709–1758), German princess 
 Wilhelmina of Prussia (1750–1820), German princess
 Wilhelmina Louisa of Hesse-Darmstadt (1755–1776), German princess and first wife of Paul I of Russia
 Wilhelmine of Prussia (1774–1837), German princess and later queen of the Netherlands
 Wilhelmine of Baden (1788–1836), German Grand Duchess of Hess and the Rhine
 Mary Adelaide Wilhelmina Elizabeth of Cambridge (1833–1897), Member of the British royal family 
 Beatrix Wilhelmina Armgard (born 1938), Queen of the Netherlands from 1980 until her abdication in 2013
 Wilhelmina Powlett, Duchess of Cleveland (1819–1901), English historian and maid of honour to Queen Victoria
 Mariae Gloria Ferdinanda Joachima Josephine Wilhelmine Huberta, Princess of Thurn and Taxis (born 1960), German aristocrat

Fictional characters 
 Wilhelmina Carmel from the Shakugan no Shana light novels
 Wilhelmina Grubbly-Plank from the Harry Potter book series
 Mina Harker (née Wilhelmina Murray) from Dracula
 Wilhelmina "Willie" Scott from Indiana Jones and the Temple of Doom
 Wilhelmina Slater from Ugly Betty
 Wilhelmine, an evil witch and major antagonist in The Mighty Hercules animated series from the 1960s
 Princess Wilhelmina or "Willie" from Bruce Coville's The Dragonslayers
 Wilhelmina "Will" Vandom of the Italian comic/cartoon series W.I.T.C.H.

Variants
Billie (English)
Elma (Dutch, German)
Guilla (Spanish)
Guillaumette (French)
Guillaumine (French)
Guillerma (Spanish)
Guillermina (Spanish)
Guilhermina (Portuguese)
Guglielma (Italian)
Guglielmina (Italian)
Guilette (French)
Helma (German)
Helmi (Finnish, Swedish)
Helmine (German)
Ilma (Spanish)
Jeltje (Dutch, Frisian)
Jeltsje (Dutch, Frisian)
Mien (Dutch)
Mientje (Dutch)
Miina (Finnish)
Mimi (French)
Mimmi (Finnish)
Mina (English, German, Polish)
Mine (German) 
Minchen (German)
Minette (French)
Mini (Finnish, Spanish)
Minka (Czech, Polish, Slovakian)
Minna (Finnish, German)
Minnie (English)
Velvela (Yiddish)
Vilhelmiina (Finnish) 
Vilhelmina (Finnish, Swedish, Hungarian)
Vilma (Czech, German, Portuguese, Slovakian, Spanish, Swedish, Finnish)
Wilhelmine (French, German)
Wilja (Scandinavian)
Willa (English)
Willamina (Scots)
Willemijn (Dutch)
Willemina (Dutch)
Willene (English)
Willie (English)
Willy (English)
Wilma (English, German)

See also
 Wilhelmina (disambiguation)

References

German feminine given names
Dutch feminine given names

br:Wilhelmine
hu:Vilhelmina (keresztnév)